Ruslan Khakymov (born 3 June 1969) is a Ukrainian wrestler. He competed in the men's Greco-Roman 57 kg at the 1996 Summer Olympics.

References

External links
 

1969 births
Living people
Ukrainian male sport wrestlers
Olympic wrestlers of Ukraine
Wrestlers at the 1996 Summer Olympics
Place of birth missing (living people)